Reyhaneh Sariri (born January 17, 1953) is an Iranian scientist, professor, and inventor. 

Sariri teaches chemistry at the University of Gilan and won The 2008 British Royal Society of Chemistry Award for her paper, "on “Study of Antioxidant Effect of Fruits and Vegetables Special to Gilan.” Sariri has published 7 books and presented 148 papers at national and international conferences.

References 

1953 births
Living people
Iranian chemists
20th-century Iranian inventors
Academic staff of the University of Gilan
Iranian women chemists